Mohammadabad (also Romanized as Moḩammadābād) is a village in Chelav Rural District, in the Central District of Amol County, Mazandaran Province, Iran. At the 2006 census, its population was 914, in 240 families.

References 

Populated places in Amol County